Owen James Klassen (born October 31, 1991) is a Canadian professional basketball player for EWE Baskets Oldenburg of the Basketball Bundesliga. He played university basketball at Acadia University and is a current member of the Canadian national basketball team.

Professional career
In September 2014, Owen started his professional career overseas at Macedonian Adriatic League team MZT Skopje, at the time coached by Zmago Sagadin. His contract was terminated by mutual agreement in March 2015, after a prognosis that a full recovery from an already lengthy back injury of his would last longer than previously expected.

On July 31, 2015, Klassen signed with Phoenix Hagen. On December 1, 2015, Owen was named German BBL Round 10 Player of the Week following an impressive 17 point, 10 rebound performance in a win over EWE Baskets Oldenburg.

On May 2, 2016, he re-signed with Hagen for one more season. On December 8, 2016, he left Hagen and signed with Montenegrin club Budućnost Podgorica for the rest of the season.

On August 3, 2017, Klassen signed with the Greek League club PAOK. On December 21, 2017 PAOK announced the end of their corporation. The same day he signed with German club s.Oliver Würzburg.

On July 27, 2018, he signed with Riesen Ludwigsburg.

In July 2019, Klassen signed with the Antwerp Giants. During the 2019-20 season, he averaged 10 points and six rebounds per game.

On August 13, 2020, he signed with Boulazac Basket Dordogne of the LNB Pro A.

On August 13, 2021, he has signed with Löwen Braunschweig of the Basketball Bundesliga.

On July 19, 2022, he has signed with EWE Baskets Oldenburg of the Basketball Bundesliga.

Career statistics

College

|-
| style="text-align:left;"| 
| style="text-align:left;"| Acadia
| 20 || 13 || 28.1 || .500 || .377 || .684 || 7.6 || 1.5 || 1.0 || 1.1 || 10.5
|-
| style="text-align:left;"| 
| style="text-align:left;"| Acadia
| 20 || 20 || 32.5 || .420 || .349 || .686 || 9.6 || 1.7 || .9 || 1.9 || 18.3
|-
| style="text-align:left;"| 
| style="text-align:left;"| Acadia
| 18 || 18 || 30.7 || .520 || .514 || .717 || 10.1 || 2.2 || .9 || 1.5 || 16.5
|-
| style="text-align:left;"| 
| style="text-align:left;"| Acadia
| 16 || 16 || 30.2 || .500 || .233 || .775 || 10.8 || 2.5 || 1.0 || 1.4 || 16.3
|-
| style="text-align:left;"| 
| style="text-align:left;"| Acadia
| 17 || 17 || 29.8 || .562 || .316 || .683 || 10.6 || 2.4 || .8 || 1.2 || 20.0
|- class="sortbottom"
| style="text-align:left;"| Career
| style="text-align:left;"|
| 91 || 84 || 30.3 || .501 || .358 || .710 || 9.8 || 2.1 || .89 || 1.41 || 16.4

Professional

Regular season

|-
| style="text-align:left;"| 
| style="text-align:left;"| MZT
| 26 || 26 || 16.1 || .579 || .222 || .550 || 5.4 || .5 || .5 || .4 || 5.7
|-
| style="text-align:left;"| 
| style="text-align:left;"| Hagen
| 33 || 33 || 22.7 || .516 || .286 || .541 || 6.4 || 1.3 || .7 || .6 || 9.4
|-
| style="text-align:left;"| 
| style="text-align:left;"| Hagen
| 9 || 9 || 27.1 || .647 || .400 || .543 || 7.8 || 1.8 || 1.1 || .7 || 13.2
|-
| style="text-align:left;"| 
| style="text-align:left;"| Budućnost
| 15 || 15 || 23.4 || .652 || .375 || .683 || 6.3 || 1.1 || .8 || .6 || 9.5
|-
| style="text-align:left;"| 
| style="text-align:left;"| Würzburg
| 21 || 21 || 20.8 || .566 || .000 || .750 || 5.5 || .9 || .4 || .4 || 8.6
|-
| style="text-align:left;"| 
| style="text-align:left;"| Ludwigsburg
| 43 || 43 || 20.6 || .549 || .259 || .776 || 6.1 || .9 || .3 || .5 || 9.8
|-
| style="text-align:left;"| 
| style="text-align:left;"| Antwerp
| 37 || 37 || 21.6 || .503 || .362 || .635 || 6.6 || 1.7 || .6 || .8 || 9.3
|-
| style="text-align:left;"| 
| style="text-align:left;"| Boulazac
| 18 || 18 || 19.6 || .563 || .200 || .702 || 5.3 || 1.6 || .9 || .5 || 7.0
|-
| style="text-align:left;"| 
| style="text-align:left;"| Braunschweig
| 30 || 30 || 22.2 || .589 || .143 || .637 || 6.5 || 1.8 || .6 || .7 || 11.2
|- class="sortbottom"
| style="text-align:left;"| Career
| style="text-align:left;"|
| 257 || 257 || 20.7 || .546 || .287 || .655 || 6.1 || 1.2 || .6 || .6 || 8.9

Playoffs

|-
| align="left" | 2017
| align="left" | Budućnost
| 1 || 1 || 26.0 || .500 || .000 || .667 || 6.0 || 0.0 || 0.0 || 0.0 || 12.0
|- class="sortbottom"
| style="text-align:left;"| Career
| style="text-align:left;"|
| 1 || 1 || 26.0 || .500 || .000 || .667 || 6.0 || 0.0 || 0.0 || 0.0 || 12.0

International

In 2014, Owen was a member of the Canadian National team's 11 game European tour.

References

External links
 Owen Klassen at aba-liga.com
 Owen Klassen at eurobasket.com
 Owen Klassen at fiba.com
 Owen Klassen at acadia.prestosports.com

1991 births
Living people
2019 FIBA Basketball World Cup players
ABA League players
Acadia Axemen basketball players
Antwerp Giants players
Basketball Löwen Braunschweig players
Basketball players at the 2011 Pan American Games
Basketball people from Ontario
Boulazac Basket Dordogne players
Canadian expatriate basketball people in France
Canadian expatriate basketball people in Belgium
Canadian expatriate basketball people in Germany
Canadian expatriate basketball people in Greece
Canadian men's basketball players
Centers (basketball)
EWE Baskets Oldenburg players
KK Budućnost players
KK MZT Skopje players
Hamilton Honey Badgers players
Medalists at the 2011 Summer Universiade
Riesen Ludwigsburg players
Pan American Games competitors for Canada
P.A.O.K. BC players
Phoenix Hagen players
Power forwards (basketball)
S.Oliver Würzburg players
Sportspeople from Kingston, Ontario
Universiade medalists in basketball
Universiade silver medalists for Canada